Denmark competed at the 2012 Summer Paralympics in London, United Kingdom from August 29 to September 9, 2012.

Medalists

Athletics 

Men's track

Men's field

Women's track

Cycling

Equestrian 

Individual events

Team

Goalball

Women's tournament

Women's team
Karina Jørgensen
Maria Larsen
Mette Præstegaard Nissen
Kamilla Bradt Ryding
Elisabeth Weichel

Group C

Sailing

Shooting

Swimming 

Men

Women

Table tennis

See also 
Denmark at the Paralympics
Denmark at the 2012 Summer Olympics

References

Paralympisk magasin 

Nations at the 2012 Summer Paralympics
2012